Tripleurospermum is a genus in the chamomile tribe within the  sunflower family. Mayweed is a common name for plants in this genus.

Most of the species are from Europe and temperate Asia although a few are from North America and North Africa.  The species are placed in Matricaria by some authors.

Plants typically have lobed leaves that are composed of one to three opposite pairs cut almost to the leaf mid rib: they have indehiscent one-celled fruits that have 3-ribs and two resinous glands at the base, Matricaria species are distinguished from these species by lacking fruits with 3-ribs and the two glands.

Species

Formerly included 
See Heteromera Matricaria Pyrethrum 
 Tripleurospermum breviradiatum  - Matricaria breviradiata 
 Tripleurospermum fuscatum  -  Heteromera fuscata 
 Tripleurospermum philaenorum  - Heteromera philaenorum
 Tripleurospermum pulchrum - Pyrethrum pulchrum

References

External links

Anthemideae
Asteraceae genera